Colton Jacobson (born December 17, 1997) is an American pop singer who rose to fame after several of his online videos went viral on popular video sharing websites such as YouTube. He released his first 2-song EP The Beginning on February 28, 2012. Colton released his full-length album Unstoppable on January 22, 2013. He is also currently into modeling.

Background 
Colton Jacobson started posting videos on YouTube in 2010. Much to his surprise, he quickly rose to fame with his cover of Bruno Mars "It Will Rain" cover song earning the #2 most shared video on YouTube. After his unforeseen success on YouTube, Colton traveled to Tampa, Florida to record 10 original songs for his upcoming albums "The Beginning" and "Unstoppable". While in Florida, Colton recorded a music video for the song "Sand Castle" which has over 2 million YouTube views to date. At the beginning of 2013, Colton released his full-length album, Unstoppable, and offered the single "Unstoppable" for free to his fans to help raise awareness for his Bully Prevention campaign. At the end of 2012 Colton announced he has become a National Spokesperson for PACER's Bully Prevention Center, alongside other musicians such as Demi Lovato.

Personal life 
Colton Jacobson, born December 17, 1997, was born and still resides in Frisco, Texas. At an early age Colton was driven towards the arts and did not participate in any sports programs. Because of this, Colton endured years of bullying at the hands of his peers, which drove him more into creating music and helping others in the same situation. His entire album "Unstoppable" tells a story of overcoming bullying, and hope that you can achieve your goals.

References
 http://www.dallasnews.com/entertainment/columnists/mario-tarradell/20130225-pop-music-frisco-teen-pop-singer-colton-jacobson-is-nurturing-a-dream-while-living-reality.ece
 http://nightcaptv.com/2013/02/21/music-box-colton-jacobson-may-be-the-next-big-star-from-dallas/#axzz2Np9vfeZv

External links

1997 births
Living people
American male pop singers
21st-century American singers
21st-century American male singers